The John S. and James L. Knight Foundation, also known as the Knight Foundation, is an American non-profit foundation that provides grants for journalism, communities, and the arts.

The organization was founded as the Knight Memorial Education Fund in 1940. For its first decade, most contributions came from the Akron Beacon Journal and Miami Herald. It was incorporated as Knight Foundation in 1950 in Ohio, and reincorporated as the John S. and James L. Knight Foundation in Florida in 1993. Its first grant in the area of journalism was to the Inter American Press Association, a press advocacy group, in Miami.

After Creed Black assumed the presidency of the foundation in 1988, its national presence grew. In 1990 the board of trustees voted to relocate the foundation's headquarters from Akron, Ohio, to Miami, Florida.

History 
From 1907 to 1933, Charles Landon Knight published the Akron Beacon Journal. One of his practices was to provide tuition assistance to college students in need. Following their father's death, John S. and James L. Knight created the Knight Memorial Education Fund in 1940 to continue the mission of helping needy Akron college students pay for college. The Akron Beacon Journal also contributed some money to the education fund.

In December 1950, the Knight Foundation was created with a beginning balance of $9,047 transferred from that education fund. Knight Foundation incorporated in the state of Ohio with the goal of carrying out the work of the education fund. At its start, the foundation funded education, social services, cultural organizations and some journalism-related causes.

In its first decade, the foundation's money came from contributions from the Akron Beacon Journal and the Miami Herald, as well as personal gifts by John and James Knight. Other Knight newspapers also contributed in the early 1960s; this led to a limited number of grants to those cities. Despite several family ties, the foundation was legally independent of Knight-owned newspapers.

Newspaper contributions to the foundation stopped five years later. At that time, the Knights' mother Clara, who died 12 November 1965, left her inheritance of 180,000 shares of Knight stock to the foundation. The stock was valued at $5.2 million.

Two years later, in 1974, Knight Newspapers merged with Ridder Publications to create Knight-Ridder Inc., at the time the largest newspaper company in the country. Lee Hills, former president of Knight Newspapers, became Knight-Ridder chairman and CEO. Hills, a foundation trustee since 1960, was the first person outside the family to head Knight Newspapers.

In April 1975, John Knight signed his final will, leaving the bulk of his Knight-Ridder shares to Knight Foundation. The foundation opened its first office in Akron with two full-time employees: President Ben Maidenburg, former Akron Beacon Journal executive editor and his secretary, Shirley Follo. More than a year after taking the reins, Maidenburg fell ill.

The foundation's headquarters moved from Akron to Miami in 1990. At that time, the foundation's portfolio was valued at $522 million and staff had grown to 14 employees.

On 5 February 1991, James Knight died, leaving a bulk of his estate, $200 million, to the foundation. Hills succeeded as chairman of the board.

With the foundation besieged by requests in the early 1990s for emergency funding to "save our symphony," Penelope McPhee, director of the Arts Program, designed the Magic of Music initiative.

In 1992, Knight launched the five-year initiative with $5.4 million in grants to build the connection between orchestras and their audiences. In 1999, the foundation approved a second phase, expanding the program to a total of $13 million over 12 years.

Knight-Ridder newspapers and the foundation held ties to 26 U.S. cities and in 1998, the foundation's board of trustees voted to permanently fund these 26 cities, independent from where Knight-Ridder bought or sold their newspaper business in the future.

Across the 26 cities, the foundation deployed program directors to oversee funding initiatives. Each city has a Knight Community Advisory Committee, a group made up of local residents, which offer funding suggestions for their city.

In 2005, to address the Internet's increasingly disruptive impact on the traditional media industry, Knight began a number of systemic changes in its approach to making grants. As one of his first actions as CEO, Alberto Ibargüen suspended the further creation of endowments of journalism programs at colleges and universities. The premise was that traditional journalism education had to change to meet the unique challenges of the digital age. Knight also  began experimenting with non-traditional approaches to connecting with new grantees, such as contests that limited grantees to 150 words to describe ideas and were open to anybody. The first of these contests, the Knight News Challenge, sought ideas that used "digital technology to inform communities." In addition to Knight's pivot toward funding digital innovations, the foundation also doubled down on its support of the First Amendment, funding regular surveys that gauged high school students' awareness of it, and helping create organizations like the Knight First Amendment Institute at Columbia University to "preserve and expand First Amendment rights in the digital age through research and education, and by supporting litigation in favor of protecting freedom of expression and the press." Under Ibargüen, Knight also expanded its support of the arts, through "Knight Arts Challenges" in a number of Knight Communities.

Programs 

The Foundation's website describes grant-making programs in journalism, communities, and the arts. Communities which had Knight-Ridder Newspapers in 1991, at the time of the last founder James L. Knight's death, are considered to be among the 26 "Knight Communities" which are eligible for funding through the Foundation's  community and arts programs.

Communities 
Knight works in 26 communities in the United States. In eight communities, a local program director leads the work: 
Akron, Ohio
Charlotte, North Carolina
Detroit, Michigan
Macon, Georgia
Miami, Florida
Philadelphia, Pennsylvania
Saint Paul, Minnesota
San Jose, California

Another 18 communities have 'Knight Donor Advised Funds' guided by Knight Foundation via local community foundations. In those communities, the local community foundation is the first point of contact for funding:

Aberdeen, South Dakota
Biloxi, Mississippi
Boulder, Colorado
Bradenton, Florida
Columbia, South Carolina
Columbus, Georgia
Duluth, Minnesota
Fort Wayne, Indiana
Gary, Indiana
Grand Forks, North Dakota
Lexington, Kentucky
Long Beach, California
Milledgeville, Georgia
Myrtle Beach, South Carolina
Palm Beach County, Florida
State College, Pennsylvania
Tallahassee, Florida
Wichita, Kansas

Education and training 
The foundation endows Knight Chairs who are journalists in tenured positions at universities across the United States. Journalism-technology labs in various universities are also funded by Knight Foundation.

Knight Foundation funds multimedia training in newsrooms such as National Public Radio and through programs like Knight-Mozilla OpenNews.

Leadership 

Knight Foundation presidents have been: John S. Knight, James L. Knight, Lee Hills, Creed C. Black, Hodding Carter III (1997–2005) and Alberto Ibargüen (2005–present).

Notable people 
 

LaSharah Bunting, senior editor and journalist

Grants 
Any individual or U.S.-based organization may apply for a grant. (Before 2010, an organization had to be a registered section 501(c)(3) non-profit organization.) The process of asking for a grant begins with a letter of inquiry describing the project concept. In addition to the foundation's regular granting program, there are three contests (calls for entries): The Knight News Challenge, the Knight Arts Challenge and the Knight Community Information Challenge. In 2011 the Foundation added a fourth contest, the Black Male Engagement Challenge. In 2015 a grant agreement was reached with Wikimedia Foundation to build a search engine called Knowledge Engine.

Assets and grant making 

Source: John S. and James L. Knight Foundation Annual Reports

Dedications 

 John S. and James L. Knight Theatre is a performance venue, part of Levine Center for the Arts in Charlotte, North Carolina
 John S. and James L. Knight Concert Hall is a performance venue, part of Adrienne Arsht Center for the Performing Arts in Miami, Florida

References

External links 

 
 

Foundations based in the United States
American journalism organizations
Organizations based in Miami
Knight family (newspapermen)
1950 establishments in Ohio
1993 establishments in Florida